The Dornișoara is a left tributary of the river Dorna in Romania. It flows into the Dorna in Poiana Stampei.

References

Rivers of Romania
Rivers of Bistrița-Năsăud County
Rivers of Suceava County